Hotel Clausewitz (German: Pension Clausewitz) is a 1967 West German comedy film directed by Ralph Habib and starring Wolfgang Kieling, Maria Brockerhoff and Friedrich Schoenfelder.

Plot
The main character of the story, Stemmka, through an inheritance, becomes the owner of a Berlin brothel, called "Pension Schölermann". In order to refresh the "establishment", Stemmka immediately hires two attractive young ladies. One of these, Marlies, whose fiancé Werner is stuck in East Berlin and was prevented from escaping to the West. Not only is the brothel used for erotic encounters, it becomes the meeting place of the intelligence services. Among the clients are a West-German nuclear scientist, a Stasi officer, a representative of the CIA and his communist opponent from beyond the Iron Curtain.

Marlies wants to rescue Werner from the power of the Stasi and therefore agrees to cooperate with the GDR. For this reason, she passes on the secrets she learns from pillow talk to the communist enemy. Her spying ends when her fiancé escapes from the east to the city's western sector. Now they can turn the tide and help the Western Allies smash the East German ring of agents.

Production
Pension Clausewitz, also known as Hotel Clausewitz, was filmed in February and March 1967 in Berlin and premiered on April 28, 1967. The story was inspired by the events surrounding the real Pension Clausewitz, which caused a veritable scandal at the end of 1964. In order not to give the impression of a faithful retelling of the actual events, the Pension Clausewitz was called  Schölermann in the film.

The FSK credits the film with the "staggering persiflage, which often turns into a fuss," mellowing the portrayal of delicate situations and frivolous utterances. Nevertheless, several scenes had to be cut, in which the bosom of striptease dancers was seen.

The comedian Karl Dall had a cameo appearance in the film as a pimp with two words dialog text: "poaching, wa" His three  colleagues of comedy combo Insterburg & Co. also have cameo appearances, but were little more than extras.

Cast

Cast list from Filmportal.de and World Filmography 1967.

References

Bibliography

External links

1967 films
West German films
1960s spy comedy films
German spy comedy films
1960s German-language films
Films directed by Ralph Habib
Films set in Berlin
Films set in West Germany
Cold War spy films
Films about prostitution in Germany
Films shot in Berlin
1967 comedy films
1960s German films